Grand Turk is an island of the Turks and Caicos Islands.

Grand Turk may also refer to:
 Grand Turk (frigate) or Étoile du Roy, three-masted sixth-rate frigate laid down in 1996
 Grand Turk International Airport, Cockburn Town, Grand Turk Island, Turks and Caicos Islands
 Battle of Grand Turk, a 1783 battle of the American Revolution
 Ottoman sultan or Grand Turk
 Rufus Wilmot Griswold or Grand Turk (1815–1857), American author
 HMS Grand Turk, a Royal Navy ship
 Grand Turk, a 300-ton privateering tradeship owned by Elias Hasket Derby
 Grand Turk, a Ku Klux Klan title

See also

 Mehmet the Conqueror, who had an epithet "Grand Turk" separate from just being the sultan
 Suleiman the Magnificent, who had an epithet "Grand Turk" separate from just being the sultan
 Turk (disambiguation)